Adaadat is a British Independent record label based in London releasing an eclectic mixture of Experimental Music, Chiptune, Noise Music, Art Rock, IDM and Breakcore. It was founded in 2002 by Angus Keith and Bjorn Hatleskog.  
The record label was initially set-up to release music by hard to find Japanese artists in the UK.
Adaadat went on to develop a reputation for "anarchic spliced noise and frenetic live shows".
In 2005 the Adaadat label was showcased on BBC One World programme broadcast on BBC Radio 1.
From 2005 to 2006 Adaadat ran a monthly club night at the ICA called Trash Trash Noise Next Door.

The label currently has (as of December 2013) over 30 releases.

Artists

 65daysofstatic
 Agaskodo Teliverek
 Atom Truck
 Bruno & Michel Are Smiling + Skipperr
 CDR
 Cow'p
 DDamage
 Duracell
 DJ 100000000
 DJ Scotch Egg
 DJ Top Gear
 Doddodo
 Drop the Lime
 Gay Against You
 Germlin
 Greypetcat
 Gum Takes Tooth
 Horatio Pollard
 Hrvatski
 Jason Forrest
 Ove-Naxx
 Lasse Marhaug
 Mathhead
 Milky Chu
 Ommm
 Reverbaphon
 Romvelope
 S. Isabella
 Shex
 Silverlink
 Strange Attractor vs. Disinformation
 Superdefekt
 The Doubtful Guest
 Utabi
 Venta Protesix
 Yaporigami

References

External links
 Official Site
Discogs

British independent record labels
Record labels established in 2002
Experimental music record labels
Electronic music record labels